The Polish–Hungarian Chronicle or Hungarian–Polish Chronicle (from ) is a medieval chronicle which exists in two redactions in five manuscripts kept in Polish libraries, including the Zamojski Codex from the second half of the 14th century and its 15th-century copy. Its full title is Chronicle of the Hungarians Attached to and Mixed with Chronicles of the Poles, and the Life of Saint Stephen (Cronica Ungarorum juncta et mixta cum cronicis Polonorum, et vita sancti Stephani). According to the Hungarian historian György Györffy, it "contains a fair number of absurdities".

The original chronicle was probably composed in the 1220s or 1230s at the court of Duke Coloman of Slavonia, the deposed King of Galicia and Lodomeria. The original manuscript was taken to Poland by Coloman's widow, Salomea, after 1241. It tells the story of the Hungarians from the reign of "Aquila" (Attila the Hun) to that of Ladislaus I.

References

Sources

Hungarian chronicles
Medieval Latin historical texts
Polish chronicles